The Tawbuid language is a language spoken by Tawbuid Mangyans in the province of Mindoro in the Philippines. It is divided into eastern and western dialects. The Bangon Mangyans also speak the western dialect of Tawbuid.

Geographic distribution
The Tau-buid (or Tawbuid) Mangyans live in central Mindoro.

In Oriental Mindoro, Eastern Tawbuid (also known as Bangon) is spoken by 1,130 people in the municipalities of Socorro, Pinamalayan, and Gloria.

In Occidental Mindoro, Western Tawbuid (also known as Batangan) is spoken by 6,810 people in the municipalities of Sablayan and Calintaan.

Phonology

Western Tawbuid

Vowels

Consonants

Historical comparison
Comparison with related languages shows a gradual loss of  >  > . For example:
Tagalog: , > Buhid:  > Tawbuid:  'I'
 >  >  'we'

E.g. (or ) 'I will arrive.'

Glottals

The glottal stop  may be realized between adjacent identical vowels. Normally though, in connected speech, two adjacent vowels are either merged to form a lengthened vowel or differentiated by stress. For example:

 'love' may be pronounced  or 
 'waiting place'  or 
 'dug'  or 

Notice that in the above, the stress precedes the glottal, whereas without a glottal, the stress is in the normal position for that particular stress pattern.
For example:

 or  'elbow'
 or : grammatical marker

Assimilation
There is a remarkable absence of assimilation at the point of articulation of nasals with following sounds. For example:

 'shade, clothing' (rather than *)
 'animal trap' (not *)
 'dried bulu (kind of bamboo)' (not *)
 'taken, died' (not *)

Description of phonemes
 close front spread
	occurs syllable-initial, middle and final
	 'dog'
	 'lake, sea, body of water'
	 'now, today'

 half close front spread

	 'said while tickling pig'
	 'tongue'
	 'blink eyes, flash light'
	 'tongue'
Occurrence in similar environment:
	 'steam or boil to cook'
	 'right-hand side'

Historically this was most likely . (Tagalog also exhibits this trend, with  being pronounced  in connected speech.) Comparison of Tawbuid with related languages shows this:
	 'axe' , cf. other dialects, including Alangan, Ilocano: 
	 'horn', cf. Tagalog 
	 'winged bean' cf. Iraya .

Within Tawbuid,  and  alternate with different grammatical forms of the same word.
	 'cross a hill'
	 'the place where you arrive after crossing a hill'
	 'a long time' (root word)
	 or  'elapsed time'

 open central unrounded

Vowel which occurs in syllable-initial, mid and final positions.
	 'species of vine'
	 'species of tree'
	 'arrow'

 half-open back rounded

	 'species of shell'
	 'eagle'
	 'breast'
	 'rinsed nami'

A similar process occurred in English and French.
	 'you (singular)' cf. Buhid 
	 'fan palm' cf. Tagalog 
	 'bush knife' cf. Alangan, Indonesian, 

 close back rounded

Syllable-initial, middle and final
	 'fingernail, toenail'
	 'crow'
	 'tame'
	 'mortar'

 close central unrounded

Syllable-initial, middle and final
	 'immediate, subsequent'
	 'pull leaves off stalk'

In orthography, the letter v is used. In the 1950s when the Reeds started writing the language, that was a convenient (and unused) letter on the typewriter. It is the least frequent vowel (>1%), and in fact the least frequent phoneme (>0.5%) in the language. (One exception noted: the name of a river near Tundayaw is Guribvy.)

 voiced bilabial plosive

Syllable-initial and final. For example:
  'eagle'
  'fall face down'

 voiceless bilabial plosive

Environment: syllable-initial (but rare word-initial) and final

Variants:  voiceless unaspirated bilabial plosive

Environment: syllable-initial
	 'compressed lump of soaked nami'
	 'small mouse species'
	 'scorpion'
	 'ampalaya, bitter gourd'
	 'full, satisfied with food'

 voiceless slightly aspirated bilabial plosive

Environment: word-final
	 'number'

There is at least one minimal pair:
	 'count (imperative)', from root  plus suffix -i
	 'slash, chop mark from a knife'

 is in contrastive distribution with  under the following circumstances:
  is never syllable-final, but  can be.
(e.g. 'skin boil',  'cockroach')

 voiced alveolar plosive

Syllable-initial and final.
	 'armspan'
	 'have a cut under one's toe'
	 'woodpecker'
Realised as  before voiceless consonants, most frequently in the verb form CVd-root-an.
	 >  'loving one another'

 voiceless alveolar plosive

Environment: syllable-initial and final
	
Variants:
	 voiceless unaspirated alveolar plosive
Environment: syllable-initial
	 'arm'
	 'able'
	 voiceless slightly aspirated (or released without aspiration) plosive
Environment: word-final
 'heavy'
 'vegetation'

 voiced velar plosive

Environment: syllable-initial and final, or initial cluster.
	 'come here'
	 'cut grass'
	 'floor'
Realised as  before voiceless consonants, for example in the verb prefix g-, and prefixes tag-, fag-.
	 >  'holding'
	 >  'choosing'
	 >  'the one who is sleeping'

 voiceless velar plosive

Environment: syllable-initial and final

 voiceless unaspirated bilabial plosive

Environment: syllable-initial
	 'love, cherish'
	 'hidden'

 voiceless slightly aspirated plosive

Environment: word-final
 'peck'
 'click'

There is a tendency for the initial  to be lost in Tawbuid compared to similar words in related languages. For example:

Tag.  > Tb.  'sin'
Tag.  > Tb.  'river name'
Tag.  > Tb.  'kill' (root word)

 voiceless labiodental fricative

Environment: syllable-initial only.
 'second most recently born child in a family'
 'thrash around'
Rare in Austronesian languages. Historically related to Tagalog and other Philippine languages. . For example:
 'fire'
 'arrow'
 grammatical linker (other Mangyan languages except Buhid)

 voiceless alveolar fricative

Can occur in all syllable positions, and in the initial consonant cluster . The affricate  is treated as a unit rather than two successive consonants.

 bilabial nasal

Can occur in all syllable positions.

 dental nasal

Environment: syllable-initial and final and syllabic
	 'cooked sweet potato'
	  'cooked'

 velar nasal

Environment: syllable-initial and final and syllabic

	 'baby, youngest child in family'
	 'cough'
	  'matured, grew up'

 voiced alveolar palatalized lateral

Environment: syllable-initial and final
	 'so that, in order to'
	 'bitter, astringent tasting'

 voiced alveolar flap

Environment: syllable-initial and (rarely) final
	 'ginger'
	 'shoddy'

 voiced bilabial approximant

Environment: syllable-initial and final
	 'chop with knife'
	 'person'
	 'tiring'

 voiced palatal approximant

Environment: syllable-initial and final
	 'kind of spirit'
	 'finger, toe'
	 'expression of pain'

Stress patterns

Primary stress in Tawbuid is either final or penultimate. Most words are stressed unpredictably, and in some speakers, all syllables seem to be equally stressed. Modification in stress occurs in affective speech (see below).

Some syllable patterns have predictable stress. A word containing two adjacent syllables with CVC patterns are stressed on the second of those two syllables, whether final or not.

	 'attacked with knife'
	 'species of grass'
	 'second most recently born child'
	 'charm made of resin'
	 'night is falling'

	 'sapling'
	 'thigh'
Where the final and penultimate syllables are open, and the vowels are the same, the stress is penultimate.
 'breast'
 'tongue'
 'wasp species'
 'dent'
 'rinsed nami'
 'immediate'
But when the vowels are different, stress can occur unpredictably.
final:  'flattened'
penultimate:  'shoulder'
final:  'fire'
penultimate:  'cry noiselessly in sleep'

A root word can change its stress when affixes are added, because affixes carry their own inherent stress.
 'one'  (penultimate)
 'united' (penultimate)
 'unity' (final)
 'agreement' (final)
In affective speech (utterances in which the speaker wishes to convey emotion), lengthening may change stress:
 'what?' may become  when said with rising pitch on the first syllable and low pitch on the second. This indicates acute surprise.

Secondary stress and tertiary stress

In words of more than three syllables there is a secondary and even a tertiary stress.
 'power'
 'mutual love'

Accent

Within the Western Tawbuid region, there are distinctive accents as well as vocabulary preferences. Taking the rebuke  'don't do that':

Balani: mid, mid, mid-to-high rising, low.
Lagutay: mid-low falling, mid, mid-low falling, mid-low falling
Anawin: mid, mid, mid-semitone higher, mid.

A rebuke or any utterance conveying a negative emotion is frequently said with lips rounded throughout.

Syllable patterns

V

Some words beginning with a vowel have a V syllable-initial pattern.
	V-CV
 'louse', 'sister/brother-in-law' V-CVC

C – in the case of the completed aspect prefix 
 'arrived' C-CV-CVC

VC
, 'great, large' VC-CVC
 'species of vine'
 'share of harvest'

CVC
 'species of tree' CVC
 'species of snake'
 'number'
 'second youngest child' CVC-CVC
 'field' CV-CVC

CCV
 'here' CCV
 'going', 'getting' CCV
 'there' CCV-VC

CVC with semivowels
 'which?' VC-CVC
 'forest' V-CVC
 'species of bat' CVC-CV-CVC
 'plentiful' (root) CVC-CVC

References

External links
Mangyan Heritage Center
Zorc, R. David. 1972. Taubuid (Batangan) notes.

Southern Mindoro languages
Mindoro